Wake Forest may refer to:

 Wake Forest, North Carolina, a town near Raleigh, North Carolina
 Wake Forest University, a university founded in the above town and now located in Winston-Salem, North Carolina 
 Wake Forest School of Medicine, the university's medical school
 Wake Forest Baptist Medical Center, a hospital affiliated with the university
 Wake Forest, name of the plantation owned by Calvin Jones (physician) that became the first home of Wake Forest University
 Wake Forest Demon Deacons, athletic teams from Wake Forest University

See also
 Lake Forest College, a college located in Lake Forest, Illinois